Roger Chappot (17 October 1940 – 7 April 2020) was a Swiss professional ice hockey player.

He played for HC Villars and Genève-Servette HC in the National League A.  He also represented the Swiss national team at the 1964 Winter Olympics.

Chappot died on 8 April 2020, at the age of 79, from complications of COVID-19 during the COVID-19 pandemic in Switzerland.

References

External links
Roger Chappot's stats at Sports-Reference.com

1940 births
2020 deaths
Genève-Servette HC players
HC Villars players
Ice hockey players at the 1964 Winter Olympics
Olympic ice hockey players of Switzerland
Swiss ice hockey defencemen
Deaths from the COVID-19 pandemic in Switzerland
People from Martigny
Sportspeople from Valais